Robert Trollope was a 17th-century English architect, born in Yorkshire, who worked mainly in Northumberland and Durham.

His work includes: 
 Eshott Hall, about 1660
 Capheaton Hall, 1667-8
 Cliffords Fort, North Shields, 1672
 Callaly Castle, 1676
 St Hilda's Church, South Shields, 1675
 Guildhall, Newcastle upon Tyne
 Netherwitton Hall, 1685

He was buried at St Mary's Church, Gateshead, Co Durham. He designed his own monument complete with statue and an inscription which is said to have read:
Here lies Robert Trollop 
Who made yon stones roll up 
When death took his soul up 
His body filled this hole up

References
    'A Descriptive and Historical Account of the Town of Newcastle-upon-Tyne (1827) from British History Online

Architects from Yorkshire
17th-century English architects
Year of death unknown
Year of birth unknown